Laagna is a village in Narva-Jõesuu, Ida-Viru County in northeastern Estonia.

See also
Battle of Laagna

References

 

Villages in Ida-Viru County